New Stage is a web series that stars Mike "The Situation" Sorrentino as Angel Adonis, a famous hip-hop star and lead judge on a reality television singing competition. Directed by Joshua David Evans and produced by YOBI.tv, the series reveals the extent to which Producer Frank Rossi (Dom Chizzoniti) must go with his judges—Angel-A (Mike Sorrentino), Lola Lathers (Ashley Gerke), and Rufus Middleton (Ben Green) -- his cast, and his entire crew to ensure the show's success.

Sorrentino is surrounded in New Stage by winners of the YOBI.tv talent contests.

In the New Stage cast are YOBIAct winners Dom Chizzoniti and Ashley Gerke; YOBILaugh winners Ben Green, Albion Gray, and Kandyce Gabrielsen; YOBISing winners Mykell, Gregory Douglass, Meggan Archey, and Tebby Phyllise; and YOBIPics winner Abrey Adams. New Stage crew members include YOBIFilm winners David Kilgo, James Domroe, and Justin Patten; and YOBIPics winners Abrey Adams, Bruce Peerson, and Paul Blackburn.

Production
New Stage was filmed in early September 2011 at the Wharton Center on the campus of Michigan State University.

Alternate Endings
The ending of the series was shot three different ways—once with each of the three featured musicians winning the New Stage competition—so that viewer votes could determine the ending of the series. As a result of those votes, Gregory Douglass edged out Meggan Archey and Tebby Phyllise, and was named the winner of New Stage as well as the winner of the June 2011 YOBISing Mini-Contest.

Episodes
Episode 1 - Culture Shock
English talent show creators Rufus and James get a wake-up call in the form of Frank Rossi and hip-hop star Angel A. It appears that America has a different way of doing things.Release date, 27 September 2011
 
Episode 2 - Funny Business
Things move forward as New Stage starts pre-production in East Lansing, MI. Still uneasy with the changes, James tries to play by Frank's rules while Rufus has his sights set on something far different...Angel's girlfriend and the show's third judge, Lola.Release date, 4 October 2011
 
Episode 3 - Identity Crisis
Rufus discovers a new side of himself when the Official Situation clothing line becomes a sponsor of New Stage. During music rehearsals for the show, the contestants prove to be a handful for the host, Mykell.Release date, 11 October 2011
 
Episode 4 - Sticky Situations
Rufus is confused when he begins receiving unprompted attention from women on set. Angel's demanding work schedule has a negative effect on his relationship with Lola.Release date, 18 October 2011 
 
Episode 5 - Behind Closed Doors
Contestants prepare for eliminations and the talent competition picks up steam. Behind the scenes, Rufus has some promotional ideas that are a bit unconventional, but Frank and James are focused on more serious business.Release date, 25 October 2011
 
Episode 6 - Top Five
The talent competition judges and producers celebrate the continued success of the show. Lola seeks comfort in her friendship with Rufus after she has a falling out with Angel.Release date, 1 November 2011
 
Episode 7 - Photo Shoot
A guest photographer joins the remaining five contestants for an exclusive behind-the-scenes photo shoot. The shoot becomes awkward when Angel and Lola are forced into close proximity during the judges' photo session.Release date, 8 November 2011
 
Episode 8 - Public Relations
The judges and producers hold a meeting to review audience feedback and marketing strategies for the show. Frank and Kandy keep the five remaining contestants busy with an intense day of EPK filming.Release date, 15 November 2011
 
Episode 9 - British Charm
Rufus and James are pleased to learn that Rufus has become a hit with the show's fans and their excitement doesn't go unnoticed by Angel. The remaining contestants face another elimination round.Release date, 22 November 2011
 
Episode 10 - Cause for Concern
Angel receives more attention than usual when he returns to the set after an unexplained trip out-of-town. The top three contestants undergo extended rehearsals to prepare for their upcoming final performances.Release date, 29 November 2011
 
Episode 11 - Trepidation
Frank holds a meeting with the show's top three finalists to discuss their future in the music business. Rufus takes extreme precaution to keep himself safe from a lurking stalker.Release date, 6 December 2011
 
Episode 12 - Rumours
Rufus looks to Angel's body guard, Sir Loin, to keep him safe from his stalker, Tabitha. The show's top three finalists face an elimination round. The judges and producers experience a tense meeting when they confront several rumours that have been circling.Release date, 13 December 2011
 
Episode 13 - Finale
The two remaining contestants have reached the final elimination round. The successful first season comes to a close, but it opens up several discussions regarding the future for the careers of Angel, Lola, Rufus, James, Frank, and Mykell.Release date, 20 December 2011

Soundtrack
The New Stage soundtrack was released on 19 September 2011. Both volumes feature winners of the YOBISing contest as well as other musicians from the New Stage cast.

Volume 1
 "New Stage" by Mykell 
 "My Life" by Mykell
 "Hope is You" by Mykell 
 "Hang Around" by Gregory Douglass
 "Naysayer" by Gregory Douglass
 "Inspired" by Gregory Douglass
 "Endless Insane" by Meggan Archey
 "Worth the Wait" by Tebby Burrows
 "Here’s to You" by Tebby Burrows
 "Bye Bye" by Stryve
 "Bowties" by Tyler Howe

Volume 2
 "Woozy" by Mykell 
 "Perfect Love" by Mykell
 "My Heart" by Mykell
 "Wild" by Gregory Douglass
 "I Wanted to Run" by Gregory Douglass
 "Another Point of View" by Meggan Archey
 "Simplify" by Meggan Archey
 "Twisted Wishes" by Tebby Burrows
 "Summer Time" by Tebby Burrows
 "Pretty Girls" by Stryve
 "Flight" by Tyler Howe

Crew (2011 Series)
Produced by 
 Danielle Ryan, assistant producer (13 episodes, 2011)
 Dianne Victor, executive producer (13 episodes, 2011)

Cinematography by 
 Peter Johnston (13 episodes, 2011)

Film Editing by 
 Jessica Grabowski (13 episodes, 2011)

Makeup Department 
 Katelyn Deck, makeup artist (13 episodes, 2011)
 Michaela Thornburg, makeup artist (13 episodes, 2011)

Second Unit Director or Assistant Director 
 Randy Holloway, first assistant director (13 episodes, 2011)

Sound Department 
 Ben Rickert, production sound mixer (13 episodes, 2011)

Camera and Electrical Department 
 Abrey Adams, still photographer (13 episodes, 2011)
 Paul Blackburn, still photographer (13 episodes, 2011)
 James Domroe, camera operator (13 episodes, 2011)
 Chris Ford, camera operator (13 episodes, 2011)
 David Kilgo, camera operator (13 episodes, 2011)
 Justin Patten, first assistant camera (13 episodes, 2011)
 Bruce Peerson, still photographer (13 episodes, 2011)

Costume and Wardrobe Department 
 Danielle Ryan, wardrobe supervisor (13 episodes, 2011)

Editorial Department 
 Joshua David Evans, assistant editor (13 episodes, 2011)
 Randy Holloway, additional editor (13 episodes, 2011)

Other crew 
 Jen O'Meara, production assistant (13 episodes, 2011)
 Jerry O'Meara, production assistant (13 episodes, 2011)
 Danielle Ryan, talent coordinator (13 episodes, 2011)

References

External links
 [ New Stage website]
 New Stage production blog 
 New Stage Volume I soundtrack 
 New Stage Volume 2 soundtrack 
 

American comedy web series